Gokseong County (Gokseong-gun) is a county in South Jeolla Province, South Korea.

Climate

Attractions
 Taeansa Temple
 Neungpa Tower
 Seomjin River
 Dongli mountain valley
 Gok-song Haneulnari Village (a farming-themed village)
 Gokseong Train Village (site of historical steam engine train where folks can take a ride on an old fashioned train)

Transportation

Train
Jeolla Line comes into Gokseong station. The Saemaul and Mugunghwa trains all stop on the way to Gokseong.

Bus
Buses to Gwangju and Gurye take 30 minutes and to Namwon takes one hour. However, it is quite difficult to go to southern parts of Jeollas like Suncheon, Jeonnam.

Car
There are 3 interchanges on the Honam Expressway. These interactions are joined with other roads.

Festival 
Gokseong World Rose Festival - Every May, the World Rose Festival is held in Gokseong, Jeollanam-do. In the train town of Gokseong Seomjin River, tourists can enjoy a variety of attractions and experience programs including a steam locomotive and a rail bike.
Gokseong Shimcheong Children's Grand Festival (2021-) - The town of Gokseong in Jeollanam-do hosts the annual Sim Cheong Festival (2001-2020) in an attempt to celebrate Sim Cheong's filial piety and reinterpret the meaning of filial piety in modern society. Gokseong is considered to be the setting for Gwaneunsa yeongi seolhwa, which is known to be the original story on which The Tale of Sim Chong is based.

Twin towns – sister cities
Gokseong is twinned with:

  Gangdong-gu, South Korea (1996) 
  Geochang, South Korea (1998) 
  Seo-gu, South Korea (2000) 
  Uijeongbu, South Korea (2010)

References

External links
County government home page (in English)
County government home page (in Korean)

 
Counties of South Jeolla Province